Olympus, in comics, may refer to:

 Olympus (Marvel Comics), the home of the Greek Gods in Marvel Comics
 Olympus, the home of the DC Comics' Olympian Gods (DC Comics)
 Olympus (Image Comics), a 2009 series from Image Comics

It may also refer to:

 Olympia (comics), a Marvel Comics location and home of the Eternals
 Olympian (comics), a DC Comics superhero

See also
Olympus (disambiguation)
Olympian Gods (comics)